The emblem of the African Union features a golden, boundary-less map of Africa inside two concentric circles, with stylised  palm leaves shooting up on either side of the outer circle.

Although when the AU was formed, a competition was announced for designing a new emblem and flag, the Assembly of the African Union decided at the Addis Ababa session of 2004 to retain the emblem and flag of its predecessor, the Organisation of African Unity, and adopt them as the new AU flag and emblem.

Symbolism
The palm leaves stand for peace. The gold circle symbolises Africa's wealth and bright future, while the green circle represents African hopes and aspiration for unity. The map of Africa, without boundaries, signifies African unity, while a series of small interlocking red rings at the base of the emblem stand for African solidarity and the blood shed for the liberation of Africa.

References

See also
Flag of the African Union

Symbols of the African Union

African Union
fi:Afrikan unioni#Logo